Banámichi (municipality) is a municipality in Sonora in northwestern Mexico.

References

Municipalities of Sonora